Mabelle is an unincorporated community in Baylor County, Texas, United States. According to the Handbook of Texas, the community had a population of 9 in 2000.

History
The settlement was established in 1906 as a station on the Wichita Valley line. A post office was granted on December 13 of that year and was named Mabelle for the daughter of resident J. T. Thompson. By 1920, the town had a depot, several businesses, and a Sunday school organization serving a population of 58. Mabelle continued as a small trade center despite a damaging tornado that struck the town about 1923. In 1940, the community had a post office and a few stores and reported a population of 35. The post office was discontinued about 1962. In 1980, Mabelle reported a population of ten, and in 1990 it was reported as six. By 2000, the population was reported at nine.

On Monday night, April 25, 1955, after performing at the Miller Brothers' M-B Corral dancehall in Wichita Falls, Elvis Presley, bass player Bill Black, and guitarist Scotty Moore headed to another gig in Seymour, a benefit show for the local volunteer fire department. Along the way, they ran out of gas near Mabelle.  After fueling up in Mabelle, Elvis and the boys arrived at the Seymour high school auditorium after most of the audience had left, but still managed to perform for the handful of people who remained.

Geography
The community lies at the intersection of U.S. Routes 82, 183, 277, 283, and Farm to Market Road 1790, 9 miles northeast of the city of Seymour, the county seat of Baylor County.

Education
A local school originally began around 1900. The community had a school in 1940. The local school remained in service until it was consolidated with the school in Seymour in 1948. The community continues to be served by the Seymour Independent School District today.

References

http://scottymoore.net/MBCorral.html

Unincorporated communities in Baylor County, Texas
Unincorporated communities in Texas